Jones v. Hendrix (Docket 21–857) is a pending United States Supreme Court case related to habeas corpus.

Background 

Marcus Jones was convicted in 2000 of being a felon in possession of a firearm, a federal crime. His first habeas petition was resolved in 2006. In 2019, in Rehaif v. United States, the Supreme Court held that people convicted of prohibited possession crimes under § 922(g) must be aware of their unlawful status, in addition to knowingly possessing firearms. Under the Antiterrorism and Effective Death Penalty Act of 1996, prisoners are barred from filing "second or successive" petitions for habeas corpus unless they meet certain exceptions, including if the Supreme Court has set forth a "new rule of constitutional law." However, there is no analogous exception for changes in the interpretation of criminal statutes. Jones tried to seek relief under , but was unsuccessful. The United States Court of Appeals for the Eighth Circuit held that no provision of federal habeas law allowed for review of his revised Rehaif claim, as he had already filed his first habeas petition a decade earlier.

Jones filed a petition for a writ of certiorari.

Supreme Court 

Certiorari was granted in the case on May 16, 2022. On June 17, 2022, the Solicitor General of the United States announced she would not defend the Eighth Circuit's judgment. On June 28, 2022, the Supreme Court appointed Morgan L. Ratner to argue as amicus curiae in support of the judgment below.

References

External links 
 

2023 in United States case law
United States Supreme Court cases
United States Supreme Court cases of the Roberts Court
United States habeas corpus case law